Alice Moore may refer to:

Alice Moore Hubbard (1861–1915), American activist
Dame Alice Moore (1474–c. 1546), wife of Sir Thomas More
Alice Moore (actress), actress who starred in films such as Woman Against the World

See also